Harrison Randolph (December 8, 1871 – 1954) was the 13th President and professor of mathematics at the College of Charleston from 1897 to 1945.

Randolph was born in New Orleans, Louisiana to John Feild Randolph and Virginia Dashiell Randolph, née Bayard. He was a lineal descendant of Edward Randolph of the Bremo Plantation, who was his great-great-great grandfather and Benjamin Harrison V, a paternal ancestor who signed the Declaration of Independence. He attended the University of Virginia, graduating in 1892 with a Master of Arts degree, and continued graduate study there from 1892 through 1895 while also serving as an instructor in mathematics. During this time he also served as the organist in the University of Virginia Chapel and directed the Virginia Glee Club, leading the latter organization on tours through the Southeast. Randolph had been elected of the President of the University of Arkansas in 1892, but declined the position. In 1895, he was elected chair of Mathematics at the University of Arkansas, remaining there until 1897.

College of Charleston
In 1897, Randolph was elected president and Chair of Mathematics at the College of Charleston. When he arrived, the college principally enrolled students from the city of Charleston, South Carolina. Under his presidency, the student body population changed as he led the building of residence halls and created scholarships to attract students from throughout South Carolina. He also oversaw the admission of women to the college in 1917. Under his leadership, the college grew from 68 students in 1905 to more than 400 in 1935.

Randolph was a member of Phi Beta Kappa and Alpha Tau Omega.

In August 2008, Charleston Magazine named Randolph the 72nd most influential individual in Charleston's history, citing his work to modernize the College of Charleston.

References

University of Virginia alumni
University of Virginia faculty
University of Arkansas faculty
Presidents of the College of Charleston
1954 deaths
1871 births